The anthem of the Miranda State, Venezuela, has lyrics by Jacinto Áñez; and music composed by Germán Lira. It honors Francisco de Miranda and was adopted as the official anthem on December 22, 1909.

Lyrics

See also
 Miranda (state)
 Francisco de Miranda
 List of anthems of Venezuela

External links 
  Miranda State Anthem history
  Miranda Anthem download at the State Government website
 Miranda State Anthem on YouTube

Anthems of Venezuela
Spanish-language songs
Miranda (state)